Aq Tappeh (also Romanized as Āq Tappeh and Āq Tepe; also known as Agh Tapeh Hajebloo) is a village in Raheb Rural District, in the Central District of Kabudarahang County, Hamadan Province, Iran.
 At the 2006 census, its population was 1,937, in 445 families.

References 

Populated places in Kabudarahang County